Čtveřín is a municipality and village in Liberec District in the Liberec Region of the Czech Republic. It has about 600 inhabitants.

Administrative parts

The village of Doubí is an administrative part of Čtveřín.

Geography
It lies in the Jičín Uplands. The Čtveřínský Stream flows through the municipality.

History
The first written mention of Čtveřín is from 1394. Doubí was first mentioned in 1388. From 1456, it was part of the Malá Skála estate.

After the abolition of the manorialism in 1850, Čtveřín with the nearby villages of Doubí, Husa (today a part of Paceřice) and Sychrov became a sovereign municipality. In 1961, Sychrov became a municipality and Čtveřín was amalgamated into it. Since 1990, Čtveřín has been a separate municipality again.

Transport
Čtveřín lies on the Liberec–Stará Paka railway line and is served by the Doubí u Turnova station in Doubí.

The D10 motorway runs through the southern part of the municipality.

Sights
The most notable historic monuments are the sculpture of Calvary in Čtveřín and the Chapel of the Guardian Angel in Doubí. A landmark is the former elementary school, today used as the municipal office.

References

External links

Villages in Liberec District